The James H. Bolton House is a historic house located at 117 West Washington Street in Bath, Steuben County, New York.

Description and history 
It was built in 1909, and is a -story, Queen Anne style frame dwelling. It is sheathed in clapboard and has a cross-gable roof with roof brackets and scalloped shingles on the gable ends. It features a broad porch with a square spindle balustrade between equally spaced rounded columns with Doric order capitals.

It was listed on the National Register of Historic Places on February 23, 2015.

References

Houses on the National Register of Historic Places in New York (state)
Queen Anne architecture in New York (state)
Houses completed in 1909
Houses in Steuben County, New York
National Register of Historic Places in Steuben County, New York